William Blagrove was a bookseller, publisher and librarian in Boston, Massachusetts, in the early 19th century. He ran the Union Circulating Library, a subscription library on School Street, from 1804 through 1811.  As a publisher, he issued "a chaste collection of amatory and miscellaneous songs, designed chiefly for the ladies" in 1808.

In 1805 his uncle, William Pelham, published The Elements of Chess, "one of the earliest works upon chess published in the United States, and the first of its kind printed at Boston. The editor of this volume — (that the book was edited by some chessplayer at the time of its publication is apparent from an exceedingly interesting appendix, containing much new and original matter) — was undoubtedly a nephew of Mr. Pelham's, named William Blagrove, who is known to have been an enthusiast of chess, and a player of merit."

Blagrove married Nancy Pelham; children included William Pelham (b. 1808).

See also
 List of booksellers in Boston

Notes

References

Further reading

 . Possibly edited by Blagrove.
 
 
 

Businesspeople from Boston
19th century in Boston
Bookstores in Boston
American publishers (people)
Libraries in Financial District, Boston
Financial District, Boston
1800s in the United States